Richard Franklin "Frank" Wright (June 15, 1938 – April 25, 2003) was a historian in the Las Vegas, Nevada area.

Wright was born on June 15, 1938 in Salt Lake City, Utah. He received a political science degree from the University of Utah.

Wright died from colon cancer in Las Vegas on April 25, 2003, at the age of 64. There is a public park near Las Vegas City Hall named in memory of Frank Wright.

Notes

1938 births
2003 deaths
20th-century American historians
American male non-fiction writers
20th-century American male writers